Tiwari Khola (Betaalghat), is a village in the Indian state of Uttarakhand. It is 28.2 km from Joshi Khola (main district), and is 178 km from the state capital Dehradun. Nainital and Almora Districts border Tiwari Khola.

Tiwari Khola is surrounded by several Tehsils: Tarikhet Tehsil, Dwarahat Tehsil and Bhikiyasain Tehsil to the north, Kotabag Tehsil and Betalghat Tehsil to the south, Sult Tehsil to the west, and Almora District Tarikhet to the east.

Nainital, Almora, Ramnagar, Haldwani are nearby Cities.

Demographics 
Hindi is the local language.

References 

Villages in Nainital district